Dina Neal (born 1972 in Las Vegas, Nevada) is an American politician and a Democratic member of the Nevada Senate, serving since November 4, 2020. She represents District 4. Neal is a member of the National Black Caucus of State Legislators.

Education
Neal earned her BA in political science from Southern University and A&M College and her JD from its Southern University Law Center.

Elections
2010 When Democratic Assemblyman Morse Arberry was term limited and left the District 7 seat open, Neal won the three-way June 8, 2010 Democratic Primary with 1,233 votes (57.16%), and won the November 2, 2010 General election with 8,462 votes (77.45%) against Republican nominee Geraldine Lewis, who had run for the Assembly in 1996 and 2008.
2012 Neal won the June 12, 2012 Democratic Primary with 1,490 votes (78.50%), and won the November 6, 2012 General election with 14,496 votes (73.25%) against Republican nominee Brent Leavitt.
On November 3, 2020, Neal was elected to the Nevada Senate seat representing the 4th district.

Personal life
Neal is the daughter of Joe Neal, who served as a member of the Nevada Senate from 1973 to 2004. Neal was elected to her father's former seat in 2020.

References

External links

Official page at the Nevada Legislature
Campaign site
 

Date of birth missing (living people)
1972 births
Living people
African-American state legislators in Nevada
African-American women in politics
Democratic Party members of the Nevada Assembly
Democratic Party Nevada state senators
Politicians from Las Vegas
Southern University alumni
Southern University Law Center alumni
Women state legislators in Nevada
21st-century American politicians
21st-century American women politicians
21st-century African-American women
21st-century African-American politicians
20th-century African-American people
20th-century African-American women